Anthidium porterae is a species of bee in the family Megachilidae, the leaf-cutter, carder, or mason bees. This bee was named in honour of Wilmatte Porter Cockerell.

Distribution
Middle America and North America

Synonyms
Synonyms for this species include:
Anthidium porterae var amabile Cockerell, 1904
Anthidium porterae personulatum Cockerell, 1907

References

External links
Images

porterae
Insects described in 1900